Abd el-Kader bel Hach Tieb (c. 1870 – 1950) was a Riffian tribal leader, caïd of the Beni Sicar, in northeastern Morocco.

He was born about 1870. He led the Riffian actions against the advances of Spain into the Cape Three Forks during the 1909 Second Melillan campaign. His tribe, the Beni Sicar, was the only one that stood loyal to Spain after the 1921 battle of Annual (when Melilla stood most defenseless), and he even recruited forces to create a friendly harka. He died on 9 December 1950. Since 18 December 1950, nine days after his death, a street of Melilla is named after him.

References 
Citations

Bibliography
 
 
 

1870 births
1950 deaths
19th-century Moroccan people
20th-century Moroccan people
Second Melillan campaign
Riffian people
Tribal chiefs